Rise of the Teenage Mutant Ninja Turtles: The Movie is a 2022 American animated superhero film directed by Andy Suriano and Ant Ward. Produced by Nickelodeon, it serves as a continuation of the animated television series Rise of the Teenage Mutant Ninja Turtles (2018–20). Ben Schwartz, Omar Miller, Brandon Mychal Smith, Josh Brener, Kat Graham, and Eric Bauza reprise their voice roles from the series and are joined by newcomer Haley Joel Osment. In the film, the Turtles are put to the test when a mysterious stranger named Casey Jones arrives from the future to warn the mutant brothers of an impending invasion·of the most dangerous alien force in the galaxy -- the Krang.

A film adaptation of Rise of the Teenage Mutant Ninja Turtles was first announced by Nickelodeon in 2019 for the streaming service Netflix. Showrunners Suriano and Ward were first approached to develop the film during the development of season 2, and worked simultaneously on the feature and the show. Due to the season being shortened, the writers had to adjust the film's plot to align it with changes made for the seasons story. The film was originally set to release in 2021 but was delayed to 2022 due to not being completed in time. The majority of the animation was provided by Flying Bark Productions and Top Draw Animation.

Rise of the Teenage Mutant Ninja Turtles: The Movie was released on Netflix on August 5, 2022, to generally positive reviews from critics.

Plot
In the year 2044, the alien Krang has invaded the Earth and the resistance has fallen. In one final attempt, Leonardo and Michelangelo send their student Casey Jones back in time to stop the invasion by finding a key that allowed the Krang to come to the Earth, though it costs Leo and Mikey their lives to do so.

Casey successfully reaches the present day, several months after Shredder's defeat. After Leo breaks Donatello's pizza box stack record, Raphael alerts both of them and Mikey of a theft unfolding by Hypno-Potamus and Warren Stone, with the key that Casey is looking for included among the stolen items. The Turtles manage to stop them, but the Foot Clan arrive and claim the key. Back in the new lair, Raph and Leo get into an argument due to the latter's growing ego.

Meanwhile, Casey finds April O'Neil who knocks him out and takes him to the Turtles' lair. He then explains his mission and after mentioning the Krang, Splinter explains that they came to Earth long ago and were exiled to another realm by a band of warriors who created and used the key, which is a mystic weapon, and that they are worshiped by the Foot. The Turtles, along with April, Splinter and Casey, go after the Foot, who have managed to open the portal. Their fight against the Krang causes them to lose their mystic powers, forcing them to retreat, but Leo manages to seize the key and close the portal. To protect Leo, Raph forces him to escape while he is captured.

Afterward, the remaining Turtles, along with Casey, go after the Krang and Raph while Splinter and April remain behind to get rid of the key. The Krang manage to find the Turtles' lair through Raph. They parasitically possess the members of the Foot Clan and send them after the key while they prepare the portal on top of the Metro Tower, the tallest building in the city. The Turtles and Casey are ambushed in the subway tunnels and get separated. Casey calls out Leo for his arrogance, revealing the truth about what happens to his family in the future, before they reunite with the rest of the Turtles. They then find Raph, who has been possessed by the Krang  and seizes the key. The Krang then use the key to open the portal and bring forth the Technodrome.

While April, Splinter, and Casey occupy the Krang forces, the Turtles board the ship. Leo goes after Raph, while Donnie and Mikey try to seize control of the ship. They are captured, but Leo reaches out to Raph and helps him break free, and the brothers manage to regain their mystic powers. The four fight valiantly but the Krang are too strong, with Mikey, Donnie, and Raph thrown out of the ship during the battle. Leo forces the Krang back to their prison realm and orders Casey to close the portal, which destroys the Technodrome and traps Leo in the realm with the enraged Krang, but Mikey, Raph, and Donnie save him using Mikey's newly-developed portal powers, leaving the Krang alone in the prison realm.

Sometime later, the heroes enjoy pizza on top of the Brooklyn Bridge, with Casey revealing that former Foot Clan recruit Cassandra Jones is his mother. They watch the city as it is being rebuilt and make a vow to defend it when it is needed. Afterward, Raph tries to break Leo's pizza box stack record.

Voice cast

 Ben Schwartz as Leonardo, Janitor
 Omar Miller as Raphael
 Josh Brener as Donatello
 Brandon Mychal Smith as Michelangelo
 Eric Bauza as Splinter
 Kat Graham as April O'Neil, Café Woman #3
 Haley Joel Osment as Casey Jones
 Jim Pirri as Krang Leader (credited as Krang One), Military Soldier #1
 Toks Olagundoye as Krang Sister (credited as Krang Two), Window Woman
 Rob Paulsen as Foot Lieutenant, Panicked Man, Military Soldier #2, Van Mover #2
 Rhys Darby as Hypno-Potamus
 John Michael Higgins as Warren Stone
 Eugene Byrd as Security Guard, Police, Office Man #2, Café Man
 Meghan Falcone as Office Woman #1, Office Woman #2
 Nika Futterman as News Anchor Tanya, Incidental Girl, Café Woman #1, Café Woman #2
 Oliver Vaquer as Professor, Helicopter Reporter, Van Mover #1, Male Bystander

Production
On February 5, 2019, it was announced that feature films based on Rise of the Teenage Mutant Ninja Turtles and The Loud House were in production for Netflix. The film was in development since October 2018, though production didn't begin until March 2020; Nickelodeon first approached showrunners Andy Suriano and Ant Ward to develop a film during development of season 2. The producers worked on the film simultaneously with the series' second season. Due to the season being shortened by Nickelodeon, the writers had to adjust the film's plot to align it with changes made for the second season's story, though the directors did noted some details would not align with the series. In January 2021, the film's plot synopsis was revealed on the franchise's official Twitter account, along with the original release year. In August, the film was pushed back to 2022 due to it not being completed in time.  

The film features a rift between Leonardo and Raphael as a plot point. A traditional aspect of TMNT lore, the filmmakers wanted to portray their rivalry in a "unique way". While writing the Krang as villains, Suriano and Ward aimed for them to be "formidable adversaries to the Turtles" and establish them as more dangerous foes than the series' portrayal of the Shredder. In order to emphasize the threat represented by the Krang, the characters' designs were altered from previous portrayals, such as altering their size proportions and their mutation method.

The majority of the film was animated by Flying Bark Productions in Sydney, Australia, who provided animation for the series, as well as Top Draw Animation in the Philippines. Due to the increased budget, the animators were allowed to feature more fluidity and color in the film than in the series.

Release
The film was originally set to be released in 2021 but was pushed back to 2022 due to it not being completed in time. The film's trailer was released on July 6, 2022. Rise of the Teenage Mutant Ninja Turtles: The Movie was released on Netflix on August 5, 2022. The film saw a theatrical release in China nationwide on November 19, 2022, where it was distributed by China Film Group Corporation.

Reception 
 On Metacritic, the film has a weighted average score of 61 out of 100, based on reviews from 5 critics, indicating "generally favorable reviews".

Hayden Mears of IGN praised the fim, writing "Not only does Rise of the Teenage Mutant Ninja Turtles: The Movie function as a superb entry point for new fans, but it also commits to tonal and stylistic makeovers that elevate the franchise in unexpected ways." Jennifer Borget of Common Sense Media wrote, "Though this is a dark, and at times frightening, story, it's also thrilling and exciting for long-time fans of the iconic characters." In a more critical review, Ricky Valero of Ready Steady Cut wrote, "While fans of the series might love the film, Rise of the Teenage Mutant Ninja Turtles [The Movie] is an overlong episode that overstays its welcome."

Accolades

References

External links

 
 

2020s American animated films
2022 animated films
2022 films
Animated films based on comics
American animated superhero films
Animated Teenage Mutant Ninja Turtles films
Anime-influenced Western animation
Animated films based on animated television series
Nickelodeon animated films
Nickelodeon original films
Nickelodeon Movies films
2020s monster movies
English-language Netflix original films
2022 directorial debut films
2020s English-language films
Animated films about turtles
Animated films about brothers
Ninja films
Flying Bark Productions films
Animated films set in New York City